Lamprolectica is a genus of moths in the family Gracillariidae.

Species
Lamprolectica apicistrigata (Walsingham, 1891)

External links
Global Taxonomic Database of Gracillariidae (Lepidoptera)

Acrocercopinae
Gracillarioidea genera